General Luna, officially the Municipality of General Luna (Surigaonon: Lungsod nan General Luna), is a 5th class municipality in the province of Surigao del Norte, Philippines. According to the 2020 census, it has a population of 22,853 people.

Formerly known as Cabuntog, it is home to annual international and national surfing competitions because of the Cloud 9 waves. As a result, the town has the reputation as the "Surfing Capital of the Philippines."

Geography
The islands of Anahawan, Daku, and La Januza are within the municipality's jurisdiction. The area is protected within the Siargao Islands Protected Landscapes and Seascapes (SIPLAS) under Republic Act 7586 (NIPAS Act).

Barangays
General Luna is politically subdivided into 19 barangays, fifteen (15) of which are located on Siargao Island while four (4) are on the other outer islands.

Climate

Demographics

Economy

Infrastructure

Roads and bridges
The Catangnan Bridge was located at Brgy. Catangnan, it has a 349-meter long and cost of P337 million. Currently under construction as of 2020.

Telecommunication
The Philippine Long Distance Telephone Company provides fixed line services. Wireless mobile communications services are provided by Smart Communications and Globe Telecommunications.

See also
List of renamed cities and municipalities in the Philippines

References

External links

 General Luna Profile at PhilAtlas.com
   General Luna Profile at the DTI Cities and Municipalities Competitive Index
 General Luna, itsmorefuninthephilippines.com
 [ Philippine Standard Geographic Code]
 Philippine Census Information
 Local Governance Performance Management System 

Municipalities of Surigao del Norte